Who Has Seen the Wind? is a 1965 television film directed by George Sidney and starring Stanley Baker. It was made under the auspices of the United Nations as part of the United Nations television film series.

Cast
Maria Schell as Maria Redek
Theodore Bikel as Josef Radek
Veronica Cartwright as Kiri Radek
Stanley Baker as Janos
Edward G. Robinson as Captain
Gypsy Rose Lee as Proprietress
Victor Jory as Peraltor
Paul Richards as Father Aston
Simon Oakland as Inspector
Lilia Skala as Nun

See also
 United Nations television film series
 List of television films produced for American Broadcasting Company

References

External links

1965 drama films
American television films
United Nations mass media
Xerox
1965 films
1960s English-language films